Louise Stanley (born Louise Keyes; January 28, 1915 – December 28, 1982), was an American actress.

Early years 
Born in Springfield, Illinois, Keyes was the daughter of Alvin Keyes, who was assistant director of the Illinois State Department of Public Safety. She changed her name to Stanley when she decided to embark on an acting career.

Film 
Although obtaining many minor roles, her career never lifted her to major stardom, but she did star in roughly twenty-four B-movies during her short career, most of which were B-Westerns. In 1935 she signed a contract with Paramount, which was not renewed after the initial six months. She then began working for Warner Bros., and was from time to time "loaned out" for use in westerns. In 1937 she was cast in the leading role, starring alongside Tex Ritter, in the western Riders of the Rockies, directed by Robert N. Bradbury.

Also in 1937, she began working for Columbia Pictures, where she made two films starring alongside Charley Chase and Andy Clyde. In 1939 she starred in The Oregon Trail, starring alongside Johnny Mack Brown. She starred in several films with cowboy star Bob Steele and others with Ritter.

Personal life 
Stanley's first husband was actor, writer and director Dennis O'Keefe, whose career spanned more than 35 years before he died at age 60. They were married on March 10, 1937, and divorced on August 12, 1938.

Following the end of her first marriage, Stanley married singing cowboy, and romantic lead for many B-Westerns, Addison Randall. She and Randall divorced, then remarried. The second marriage between the two ended after Randall became involved in an affair with actress Louise Brooks.

On August 25, 1942, Stanley married Navy pilot Charles Munn Jr. That marriage also was short-lived, ending in divorce only a short time later with allegations that he beat her.

Louise Stanley retired from acting, and died from cancer in Cocoa Beach, Florida in 1982.

Partial filmography
 Fugitive in the Sky (Unbilled) (1936)
 Lawless Land (1937)
 Sing, Cowboy, Sing (1937)
 Riders of the Rockies (1937)
 Durango Valley Raiders (1938)
 Thunder in the Desert (1938)
 Danger on the Air (1938)
 The Oregon Trail (1939)
 Yukon Flight (1940)
 Pinto Canyon (1940)
 Sky Bandits (1940)
 The Cheyenne Kid (1940)

References

External links

 
 
 
 B-Western Ladies, Louise Stanley

People from Springfield, Illinois
Actresses from Illinois
Deaths from cancer in Florida
American film actresses
1915 births
1982 deaths
Warner Bros. contract players
20th-century American actresses